Brian Lautaro Guzmán (born 18 January 2000) is an Argentine professional footballer who plays as a forward for Montevideo City on loan from Talleres.

Career
Guzmán's youth career began with Roque Sáenz Peña, prior to joining the system of Alumni. In 2013, Talleres signed Gúzman. He featured for the club's U20 team at the 2018 U-20 Copa Libertadores in Uruguay, making appearances against Atlético Venezuela and São Paulo. Later that year, in October, Gúzman was moved into Talleres' first-team for an Argentine Primera División fixture with Defensa y Justicia, subsequently making his professional debut by coming on at half time in place of Junior Arias as they lost 2–0.

On 27 January 2021, Guzmán joined Aldosivi on loan for the rest of the season with a purchase option. He returned to Talleres at the end of the year. In February 2022, he was loaned out to Montevideo City for the 2022 season.

Career statistics
.

References

External links

2000 births
Living people
People from Villa María
Argentine footballers
Argentine expatriate footballers
Association football forwards
Argentine Primera División players
Uruguayan Primera División players
Talleres de Córdoba footballers
Aldosivi footballers
Montevideo City Torque players
Argentine expatriate sportspeople in Uruguay
Expatriate footballers in Uruguay
Sportspeople from Córdoba Province, Argentina